Swinford railway station is a disused railway station associated with the town of Swinford in County Mayo, Ireland. Originally the station was opened in 1895 as part of the route between Claremorris and Sligo. It was closed to passenger traffic in 1963, with goods traffic ending in 1975.

The Western Railway Corridor was proposed to be rebuilt as part of the government's Transport 21 plan. The plan intended that the line would re-open in two stages, with the first stage covering the route between Limerick and Claremorris; however only Limerick to Athenry was reopened. The second stage, currently unfunded, would see the line restored between Claremorris and Sligo, with Swinford as an intermediate stop.

References

Iarnród Éireann stations in County Mayo
Proposed railway stations in the Republic of Ireland
Railway stations opened in 1895
Railway stations closed in 1975
Swinford, County Mayo